Neocollyris roeschkei is a species of ground beetle in the genus Neocollyris in the subfamily Carabinae. It was described by Horn in 1892.

References

Roeschkei, Neocollyris
Beetles described in 1892